parasitic fungi of the genus Ophiocordyceps, particularly Ophiocordyceps robertsii and Ophiocordyceps sinensis
 Awetö people, an ethnic group of Brazil
 Awetö language, a language of Brazil

See also 
 Awetu River, in Ethiopia

Language and nationality disambiguation pages